Manipuri religion may refer to:
 Manipuri Vaishnavism, a Hindu sect of the Meitei people, the predominant ethnic group of Manipur
 Religion in Manipur
 Sanamahism, the indigenous ethnic religion of the Meitei people, the predominant ethnic group of Manipur